"Sea of Love" is a song written by John Philip Baptiste (better known as Phil Phillips) and George Khoury. It was the only top-40 chart-maker for Phillips, who never recorded another hit.

Background
Baptiste, who was working as a bellboy in Lake Charles, Louisiana, wrote "Sea of Love" for a love interest. He was introduced to local record producer George Khoury, who brought Baptiste into his studio to record it. At Khoury's request, Baptiste took the stage name of Phil Phillips. The song, originally credited to Phil Phillips with The Twilights, was released on a small record label owned by Khoury, but due to its success it was eventually leased to Mercury Records. Despite the success of "Sea of Love", Phillips claimed that he only ever received US$6,800 for recording it.

Chart performance
Phil Phillips' 1959 recording of the song peaked at No. 1 on the U.S. Billboard R&B chart and No. 2 on the Billboard Hot 100. "The Three Bells" by The Browns kept it from the No.1 spot.  In 1959, it sold over one million copies and was awarded a gold disc.

Weekly charts
Phil Phillips

Marty Wilde

Del Shannon

The Honeydrippers

Phil Phillips & the Twilights/Marty Wilde

Year-end charts
The Honeydrippers

Notable cover versions
The song has been covered by a number of artists since the first 1959 recording. Among the most notable versions are the following:
Later in 1959, in the UK, Marty Wilde covered the song which subsequently  peaked at No. 3 in the UK Singles Chart.  The original Phil Phillips rendition failed to chart there. This version is also featured in Chanel No. 5: La Star (1990) ad.
B. J. Thomas recorded the song on his 1975 album Reunion.
Robert Plant's Honeydrippers included it on their 1984 album, The Honeydrippers: Volume One. This version went on to reach No. 3 on the Billboard Hot 100 chart in early 1985 and No. 1 on the adult contemporary chart in 1984.
 Tom Waits's version was first available on the 1989 soundtrack for the movie Sea of Love and later on his 2006 album Orphans 
Cat Power recorded it on her 2000 album, The Covers Record. The 2007 film Juno featured her version in its soundtrack.

In popular culture 
The song shares a title with, and features prominently in the plot-line of, the 1989 Harold Becker film Sea of Love starring Al Pacino and Ellen Barkin.
 "Sea of Love" was used in the 2000 film Frequency starring Dennis Quaid and Jim Caviezel.
 "Sea of Love" was used to close out The Simpsons season 16 episode "Future-Drama".
 "Sea of Love" was used in the Futurama season 7 episode Naturama in 2012
Kraken Rum began using "Sea of Love" in commercials in 2014.

See also
List of 1950s one-hit wonders in the United States
List of number-one R&B singles of 1959 (U.S.)
List of number-one adult contemporary singles of 1984 (U.S.)
List of RPM number-one singles of 1984

References

External links
 
 
 
 

1959 songs
1959 singles
1981 singles
1984 singles
Robert Plant songs
Jimmy Velvit songs
Del Shannon songs
The Guess Who songs
Iggy Pop songs
Tom Waits songs
Mercury Records singles
Swamp pop music
Pop ballads
Rhythm and blues ballads
Rock ballads
American rhythm and blues songs
Arvingarna songs
RPM Top Singles number-one singles